

QI10A Atlantic salmon

QI10AA Inactivated viral vaccines
QI10AA01 Salmon pancreas disease virus (SPD)
QI10AA02 Salmon pancreas disease (SPD), protein coding plasmid

QI10AB Inactivated bacterial vaccines (including mycoplasma, toxoid and chlamydia)
QI10AB01 Aeromonas
QI10AB02 Aeromonas + vibrio
QI10AB03 Aeromonas + moritella + vibrio
QI10AB04 Yersinia

QI10AC Inactivated bacterial vaccines and antisera
Empty group

QI10AD Live viral vaccines
Empty group

QI10AE Live bacterial vaccines
Empty group

QI10AF Live bacterial and viral vaccines
Empty group

QI10AG Live and inactivated bacterial vaccines
Empty group

QI10AH Live and inactivated viral vaccines
Empty group

QI10AI Live viral and inactivated bacterial vaccines
Empty group

QI10AJ Live and inactivated viral and bacterial vaccines
Empty group

QI10AK Inactivated viral and live bacterial vaccines
Empty group

QI10AL Inactivated viral and inactivated bacterial vaccines
QI10AL01 Infectious pancreatic necrosis (IPN) virus + aeromonas + vibrio
QI10AL02 Infectious pancreatic necrosis (IPN) virus + aeromonas + moritella + vibrio
QI10AL03 Infectious pancreatic necrosis (IPN) virus + aeromonas
QI10AL04 Infectious pancreatic necrosis (IPN) virus + infectious salmon anaemia (ISA) virus + aeromonas + moritella + vibrio
QI10AL05 Infectious pancreatic necrosis (IPN) virus + pancreatic disease (SPD) virus + aeromonas + moritella + vibrio

QI10AM Antisera, immunoglobulin preparations, and antitoxins
Empty group

QI10AN Live parasitic vaccines
Empty group

QI10AO Inactivated parasitic vaccines
Empty group

QI10AP Live fungal vaccines
Empty group

QI10AQ Inactivated fungal vaccines
Empty group

QI10AR In vivo diagnostic preparations
Empty group

QI10AS Allergens
Empty group

QI10AU Other live vaccines
Empty group

QI10AV Other inactivated vaccines
Empty group

QI10AX Other immunologicals
Empty group

QI10B Rainbow trout

QI10BA Inactivated viral vaccines
Empty group

QI10BB Inactivated bacterial vaccines (including mycoplasma, toxoid and chlamydia)
QI10BB01 Vibrio
QI10BB02 Aeromonas + vibrio
QI10BB03 Yersinia
QI10BB04 Aeromonas + moritella + vibrio + flavobacterium

QI10BC Inactivated bacterial vaccines and antisera
Empty group

QI10BD Live viral vaccines
Empty group

QI10BE Live bacterial vaccines
Empty group

QI10BF Live bacterial and viral vaccines
Empty group

QI10BG Live and inactivated bacterial vaccines
Empty group

QI10BH Live and inactivated viral vaccines
Empty group

QI10BI Live viral and inactivated bacterial vaccines
Empty group

QI10BJ Live and inactivated viral and bacterial vaccines
Empty group

QI10BK Inactivated viral and live bacterial vaccines
Empty group

QI10BL Inactivated viral and inactivated bacterial vaccines
Empty group

QI10BM Antisera, immunoglobulin preparations, and antitoxins
Empty group

QI10BN Live parasitic vaccines
Empty group

QI10BO Inactivated parasitic vaccines
Empty group

QI10BP Live fungal vaccines
Empty group

QI10BQ Inactivated fungal vaccines
Empty group

QI10BR In vivo diagnostic preparations
Empty group

QI10BS Allergens
Empty group

QI10BU Other live vaccines
Empty group

QI10BV Other inactivated vaccines
Empty group

QI10BX Other immunologicals
Empty group

QI10C Carp

Empty group

QI10D Turbot

Empty group

QI10E Ornamental fish

Empty group

QI10F Atlantic cod

QI10FB Inactivated bacterial vaccines (including mycoplasma, toxoid and chlamydia)
QI10FB01 Vibrio
QI10FB02 Aeromonas + vibrio

QI10X Pisces, others
Empty group

References

I10